Romolo is a station on Line 2 of the Milan Metro. The station is located between Viale Romolo and Largo Alberto Ascari. It is connected to the railway station of the same name. It was opened on 3 April 1985 as a one-station extension from Porta Genova.

Nearby landmarks
IULM University of Milan
NABA – Nuova Accademia di Belle Arti Milano

References

External links

Line 2 (Milan Metro) stations
Railway stations opened in 1985
1985 establishments in Italy
Railway stations in Italy opened in the 20th century